Nationality words link to articles with information on the nation's poetry or literature (for instance, Irish or France).

Events
 June – Rev. John Henry Newman writes "The Pillar of Cloud" (Lead, Kindly Light) on a boat in the Strait of Bonifacio.
 15 September – English poet Arthur Henry Hallam, a friend of Tennyson (and fiancé of his sister Emily), dies suddenly of a brain haemorrhage in Vienna aged 22. This year in his memory Tennyson writes "Ulysses" (completed 20 October; published in Poems of 1842), Tithon (an early version of "Tithonus") and "The Two Voices" (originally entitled "Thoughts of a Suicide") and begins "Morte d'Arthur" (published 1842) and "Tiresias" (published 1885). In 1850 he will publish In Memoriam A.H.H.

Works published

United Kingdom
 Elizabeth Barrett (later Elizabeth Barrett Browning), anonymously published translation from the Ancient Greek of Aeschylus, Prometheus Bound
 Edward Bickersteth, Christian Psalmody
 Caroline Bowles (later Caroline Anne Southey), Tales of the Factories
 Robert Browning, Pauline, a fragment of a confession, the author's first published poem, published anonymously, sells no copies (first reprinted in Poetical Works 1868 with minor revisions and an "apologetic preface")
 Agnes Bulmer's Messiah's Kingdom was published; an epic poem running to 14,000 lines and  considered the longest poem ever written by a woman.
 Hartley Coleridge, Poems
 Allan Cunningham, The Maid of Elvar
 Ebenezer Elliott, The Splendid Village; Corn Law Rhymes, and Other Poems
 Felicia Dorothea Hemans, Hymns on the Works of Nature
 John Stuart Mill, Thoughts on Poetry and its Variants (criticism)
 Robert Montgomery, Woman: The Angel of Life
 Sir Walter Scott, The Poetical Works of Sir Walter Scott, Bart, the final revised edition, edited by J. G. Lockhart and illustrated by J. M. W. Turner; in 12 volumes, published starting in May of this year, with Volume I, and ending in April 1834, with Volume XII
 Letitia Elizabeth Landon, writing under the pen name "L.E.L." Fisher's Drawing Room Scrap Book, 1834, including The Zenana

United States
 Maria Gowen Brooks, Zophiel, highly emotional verse, influenced by her connections with the English Lake poets; Charles Lamb asserted she could not have been the author, "as if there could have been a woman capable of anything so grand"
 Richard Henry Dana, Sr., Poems and Prose Writings, a very well received book, including many of his better-known essays and poems, including "The Buccaneer" (see also the expanded edition 1850)
 Maria James, "Ode on the Fourth of July 1833"
 Henry Wadsworth Longfellow, translator, Coplas de Don Jorge Manrique
 Penina Moise, Fancy's Sketch Book, called the first poetry book published by a Jewish American in the United States; including humorous and satirical poems on love, poverty and death as well as comments on the suffering of Jews abroad, who are encouraged to immigrate to the United States

Other
 M. J. Chapman, "Barbados" by a pro-slavery planter in Barbados
 Marceline Desbordes-Valmore, Les Fleurs, France
 Wilhelm Hey, Fünfzig Fabeln für Kinder ("Fifty Fables for Children")
 Frederik Paludan-Muller, Dandserinden ("The Danseuse" or "Dancing Girl"), inspired by Lord Byron's poetry; an ironic poem in ottava rima; Denmark
 France Prešeren, A Wreath of Sonnets
 Alexander Pushkin, The Bronze Horseman (Russian, Медный всадник, literally "The Copper Horseman"), written, first published 1837
 Pietro Zorutti (Pieri Çorut), Plovisine, Friulian

Births
Death years link to the corresponding "[year] in poetry" article:
 23 January – Lewis Morris (died 1907), Anglo-Welsh poet
 5 May – Richard Watson Dixon (died 1900), English poet and clergyman
 29 May – George Gordon McCrae (died 1927), Australian
 24 August – Narmadashankar Dave, also known as "Narmad" (died 1886), Indian, Gujarati-language poet
 8 October – Edmund Clarence Stedman (died 1908), American poet, critic, essayist, banker and scientist
 19 October – Adam Lindsay Gordon, Azores-born Australian "national poet", jockey and politician
 27 December – Larin Paraske (died 1904), Finnish Izhorian oral poet and rune-singer

Deaths
Birth years link to the corresponding "[year] in poetry" article:
 4 February – John O'Keefe (born 1747), Irish poet, playwright and actor
 14 April – Joseph-Isidore Bédard (born 1806), Canadian poet, lawyer and politician
 7 September – Hannah More (born 1745), English poet, playwright, religious writer and philanthropist
 15 September – Arthur Hallam (born 1811), English poet in whose memory Alfred, Lord Tennyson later writes In Memoriam A.H.H.
 26 September – Robert Anderson (born 1770), English Cumbrian dialect poet
 10 October – Thomas Atkinson (born 1801?), Scottish poet, bookseller and politician, dies at sea
 30 December – William Sotheby (born 1757), English poet and translator
 Date not known – Bankidas Asiya (born 1771), Rajasthani poet and scholar

See also

 19th century in literature
 19th century in poetry
 Golden Age of Russian Poetry (1800–1850)
 List of poetry awards
 List of poets
 List of years in literature
 List of years in poetry
 Poetry
 Young Germany (Junges Deutschland) a loose group of German writers from about 1830 to 1850

Notes

19th-century poetry

Poetry